FC Kuban-2 Krasnodar was a Russian football team from Krasnodar. It was a farm club for the team FC Kuban Krasnodar.

It was registered to play in the Russian Professional Football League (third level) for the 2016–17 season.

Kuban's reserve team played professionally previously as FC Kuban-d Krasnodar in the Russian Third League 1996 and Russian Third League 1997.

The parent club was dissolved due to accumulated debts in the summer of 2018.

Last-known line-up
As of 22 February 2018, according to the PFL website.

References

External links 
 Club profile at FootballFacts.ru 

Association football clubs established in 1996
Association football clubs established in 2015
Association football clubs established in 2016
Kuban-2
FC Kuban Krasnodar
1996 establishments in Russia
2015 establishments in Russia
2016 establishments in Russia
Association football clubs disestablished in 1997
Association football clubs disestablished in 2015
Association football clubs disestablished in 2018
1997 disestablishments in Russia
2015 disestablishments in Russia
2018 disestablishments in Russia